Alfred Kwame Agbesi (born 20 February 1955) is a lawyer and politician in Ghana. He belongs to the National Democratic Congress. He was the former Member of Parliament for Ashaiman (Ghana parliament constituency) and a former Deputy majority leader of Parliament of Ghana under John Dramani Mahama administration.

Early life and education

Alfred Kwame Agbesi was born on 20 February 1955. He was hails from Agave-Afedume in the Volta Region of Ghana. He was educated in Ghana. He holds Bachelor of Laws degree from the University of Ghana, Legon in 1979 and BL (GSL) 1981.

Career 
He worked with the judicial service of Ghana as a Lawyer before he became a member of parliament for Ashaiman. He is thus a lawyer and Ghanaian politician by profession.

Political career

Alfred Agbesi was the member of Ghana's parliament for Ashaiman Constituency from 2005 up till 2016 when he lost to the current member of Parliament for the Ashaiman constituency Ernest Norgbey in the Primaries of the National Democratic Congress in 2015.

After being elected in 2008 he was chosen as a member of Ghana delegation to the ECOWAS Parliament in Abuja, Nigeria in 2009 and again in 2013 to represent Ghana.

2004 Elections 
Agbesi was elected as the member of parliament for the Ashaiman Constituency for the first time in the 2004 Ghanaian general elections. He was elected with 53,559 votes out of 94,091 total valid votes cast. This was equivalent to 56.9% of the total valid votes cast. He was elected over Hajia Hajara M. Ali of the People's National Convention, Teye Emmanauel Kinsford Kwesi of the New Patriotic Party, Phoyon Isaac Bruce Mensah of the Convention People's Party and Amable Kwame Samuel am independent candidate. These obtained 2.9%, 38.3%, 0.9% and 1.0% respectively of the total valid  votes cast. Agbesi was elected on the ticket of the National Democratic Congress. His constituency was a part of the 10 constituencies won by the National Democratic Congress in the Greater Accra region in that elections. In all, the National Democratic Congress won a total 94 parliamentary seats in the 4th parliament of the 4th republic of  Ghana.

Personal life 
Agbesi is married with six children. He is a Christian.

References

1955 births
Living people
Ghanaian Pentecostals
Ghanaian MPs 2005–2009
Ghanaian MPs 2009–2013
Ghanaian MPs 2013–2017
University of Ghana alumni
21st-century Ghanaian politicians